Thomas Arthur (died 1532) was an English divine and dramatist.

A native of Norfolk, he was educated at Cambridge, probably in Trinity Hall, and imbibed Protestant opinions from his fellow-countryman, Thomas Bilney. Arthur was admitted a fellow of St. John's College in February 1517–18, being then a master of arts, and in 1518 he occurs as principal of St. Mary's Hostel. In 1526 he and Bilney were charged with heresy, and compelled to take an oath abjuring Luther's opinions. In November 1527 they were brought as relapsed heretics before Cardinal Wolsey and other bishops in the chapter-house at Westminster. Both of them recanted and did penance, though Bilney afterwards had the courage of his opinions and suffered for them at the stake. Arthur died at Walsingham in 1532.

He wrote: 1. Microcosmus, a tragedy. 2. Mundus plumbeus, a tragedy. 3. In quosdam Psalmos. 4. Homeliæ Christianæ. 5. A translation of Erasmus, De Milite Christiano.

References

Year of birth unknown
1532 deaths
English Renaissance dramatists
16th-century English writers
16th-century male writers
16th-century English dramatists and playwrights
16th-century Protestants
People from Norfolk